Władysław Kajetan Nadratowski (27 June 1892 – 21 April 1985) was a Polish rower. He competed in the men's coxed four event at the 1924 Summer Olympics.

References

External links
 

1892 births
1985 deaths
Polish male rowers
Olympic rowers of Poland
Rowers at the 1924 Summer Olympics
People from Mielec County
Sportspeople from Podkarpackie Voivodeship
Polish Austro-Hungarians
People from the Kingdom of Galicia and Lodomeria
Polish emigrants to the United Kingdom